Adolphus Cunningham Hailstork III (born April 17, 1941) is an American composer and educator.  He was born in Rochester, New York, and grew up in Albany, New York, where he studied violin, piano, organ, and voice. He currently resides in Virginia Beach, Virginia.

Career 
Hailstork began his musical career in 1963, when he studied composition with Mark Fax at Howard University, Washington, DC (BMus 1963). In the summer of 1963 he attended the American Conservatory at Fontainebleau, France, where he studied with Nadia Boulanger. In 1965, Hailstork received a Bachelor of Music from the Manhattan School of Music, where he studied under Vittorio Giannini and David Diamond, and in 1966 received a Master of Music at the same institution. After studying under H. Owen Reed, Hailstork received his PhD in composition from Michigan State University in 1971.

From 1969 to 1971, Hailstork taught at Michigan State University. He then served as professor at Youngstown State University in Ohio from 1971 to 1976, and in 1977 accepted a post as professor of music and Composer-in-Residence at Virginia's Norfolk State University. He also taught as professor of music and Composer-in-Residence at Old Dominion University in Norfolk, Virginia.

Hailstork is of African American, native American and European ancestry and his works blend musical ideas from the African, American and European traditions.

In October 2022 his work was publicised in Britain when he was featured as "Composer of the Week" on BBC Radio 3.

Hailstork married in 2007.

Awards and Publications 

 1971: Ernest Bloch Award for choral composition
 Mourn Not the Dead 
 1977: Belwin-Mills Max Winkler Award, presented by the Band Directors National Association
 Out of Depths 
 1983: First Prize, Virginia College Band Directors
 Guernica
 1987: Fulbright fellowship for study in Guyana 
 1992: named a Cultural Laureate of the Commonwealth of Virginia 
 1995: First Prize, University of Delaware Festival of Contemporary Music
 Consort Piece
 1999: Brock Commission from the American Choral Directors Association 
2001 Honorary Doctorate from the College of William and Mary, Williamsburg, VA

Hailstork is published by Theodore Presser Company and Carl Fischer Music. Old Dominion University holds several archival documents of Adolphus Hailstork in the special collections area of the F. Ludwig Diehn Composers Room, in the Diehn Fine and Performing Arts Center.

Selected works

Works for Solo Instruments
2 Scherzos for solo piano
Bassoon Set for solo bassoon
Eight Variations On “Shalom Chaverim” for solo piano
Five Friends for solo piano
Flute Set for solo flute
Four Preludes for solo harp
Great Day (That Great Gittin' Up Mornin') for solo carillon
Ignis Fatuus (Mysterious Fires) for solo piano
Piano Sonata No. 2 for solo piano
Piano Sonata No. 3 for solo piano
The Surprising Thing Is for solo violin
Theme and Variations on "Draw the Sacred Circle Closer" for solo CelloSonata for Solo CelloThree Smiles for Tracy for solo clarinetTrio Sonata for solo pianoTwo Studies on Chant Melodies" for solo organ
Variations for solo trumpet
Toccata on Veni Emmanuel for Organ/E.C.Schirmer 1996

Works for Chamber Ensemble
American Fanfare for 3Tpt. 4Hn. 3Tbn. Tu. 3Perc. Timp.
American Landscape for string duet
Armegeddon for organ and two percussion
As Falling Leaves
Baroque Suite for violin and piano
The Blue Bag for clarinet and piano
Consort Piece for septet
Divertimento for violin and viola
Evensong for violin and cello
Fanfare on Amazing Grace for brass quintet, timpani, and organ
"Fantasy, Elegy & Caprice" for cello and piano
Fantasy Piece for viola and piano
Four Hymns Without Words for trumpet and piano
Guest Suite for four hands on one piano
Ghosts in Grey and Blue for trumpet, horn, and trombone
I Am Only One for SATB choir
John Henry's Big (Man vs. Machine) for trombone and piano
Little Diversions for Lord Byron's Court for two violins or string duet
Sanctum for clarinet and piano or viola and piano
A Simple Caprice for clarinet and piano
Sonata for trumpet and piano
Sonata for two pianos
Springtime for Elephants for two tubas
String Quartet No. 1
String Quartet No. 2 - Variations on "Swing Low, Sweet Chariot"
Three Meditations for viola and organ
Two by Two for horn and trombone
Variations on a Guyanese Folk Song for violin and piano
Ventriloquist Acts of God for soprano and piano
Violin Concerto for violin and piano
Who is Sylvia? For Coloratura Soprano, Violin, and Piano

Works for Chorus and Orchestra
Break Forth for Chorus and Orchestra
Crispus Attucks - American Patriot for mezzo, tenor, bass-bariton, large chorus, and orchestra
Done Made My Vow for narrator, soloists, mixed chorus, and orchestra
EarthRise (A Song of Healing) for two choirs and orchestra
Four Spirituals for two sopranos, mixed chorus and orchestra
The Gift of the Magi A “Choral Ballet” for dancers, chamber orchestra and children's chorus
I will lift up mine eyes, cantata for tenor, choir, and orchestra
Serenade “To Hearts Which Near Each Other Move” for SATB choir and orchestra
Songs of Innocence for three soloists, chorus and orchestra
Within Our Gates for solo soprano, solo tenor, SATB chorus and string orchestra
The World Called for solo soprano, SATB chorus and orchestra

Works for Chorus
Shout for Joy (The Bank Street Festival Anthem)

Works for Wind Ensemble
American Guernica

Works for Orchestra
An American Port of Call
Baroque Suite for String Orchestra (with optional Harpsichord)
Church Street Serenade for String Orchestra
Concertino for Trumpet and Orchestra
Epitaph for a Man Who Dreamed In memoriam: Martin Luther King, Jr. (1929-1968) 
Essay for Strings
Fanfare on Amazing Grace for Orchestra
Hercules"IntradaLachrymosa: 1919Sonata for Trumpet (or Clarinet) and String OrchestraSymphony No. 3Celebration!Three SpiritualsTwo Romances for Viola and Chamber OrchestraViolin ConcertoOperasJoshua’s Boots an Opera in one ActPaul Laurence Dunbar: Common Ground An Operatic TheaterpieceRise for Freedom: The John P. Parker Story''

References

External links

"Kaleidoscope: The Musical World of Adolphus Hailstork" at Old Dominion University Libraries
Adolphus Hailstork's page at Theodore Presser Company
"Adolphus C. Hailstork (b. 1941) – African American Composer & Professor" at AfriClassical.com

1941 births
Living people
20th-century American composers
20th-century American male musicians
20th-century American pianists
20th-century classical composers
20th-century classical pianists
21st-century American composers
21st-century American male musicians
21st-century American pianists
21st-century classical composers
21st-century classical pianists
African-American classical composers
American classical composers
African-American classical pianists
African-American male classical composers
American male classical composers
American male pianists
Composers for carillon
Composers for piano
Male classical pianists
Manhattan School of Music alumni
Michigan State University alumni
Norfolk State University faculty
Youngstown State University faculty
20th-century African-American musicians
21st-century African-American musicians